
Year 923 (CMXXIII) was a common year starting on Wednesday (link will display the full calendar) of the Julian calendar.

Events 
 By place 

 Europe 
 June 15 – Battle of Soissons: King Robert I is killed; the Frankish army, led by Charles the Simple, is defeated and routed near Soissons. Charles is captured and imprisoned at Péronne. The nobles elect Robert's son-in-law Rudolph, duke of Burgundy, as king of the West Frankish Kingdom (until 936).
 July 29 – Battle of Fiorenzuola: Lombard forces led by King Rudolph II and Adalbert I, margrave of Ivrea, defeat the deposed Emperor Berengar I at Firenzuola (Tuscany). A pact is reached between Rudolph and Berengar, who abdicates the imperial throne and cedes sovereignty over the rest of Italy.

 Asia 
 May 13 – The Later Liang, one of the Five Dynasties in  China, falls to Later Tang (founded by Li Cunxu). Li proclaims himself emperor and moves his residence back to the old Tang capital of Luoyang. 
 August 11 – The Qarmatians of Bahrayn capture and pillage the city of Basra.

Births 
 September 7 – Suzaku, emperor of Japan (d. 952)
 Abū Hayyān al-Tawhīdī, Muslim intellectual (d. 1023)
 Al-Shaykh al-Saduq, Muslim scholar (approximate date)
 Eadred (or Edred), king of England (d. 955)
 Fujiwara no Nakafumi, Japanese waka poet (d. 992)
 Jeongjong, king of Goryeo (Korea) (d. 949)
 Liu Honggao, Chinese chancellor (d. 943)

Deaths 
 June 15 – Robert I, king of the West Frankish Kingdom (b. 860)
 August 2 – Plegmund, archbishop of Canterbury (or 914)
 August 27 – Ageltrude, queen of Italy and Holy Roman Empress 
 October 8 – Pilgrim I, archbishop of Salzburg 
 November 20
 Jing Xiang, Chinese strategist
 Li Zhen, official of Later Liang
 Abu Bakr al-Khallal, Muslim scholar and jurist (b. 848)
 Adarnase IV, prince of Iberia/Kartli (Georgia)
 Badr al-Hammami (the Elder), Abbasid general
 Gurgen I, prince of Tao-Klarjeti (Georgia)
 Harshavarman I, king of Angkor (Cambodia)
 Ibn Khuzaymah, Muslim hadith and scholar (b. 837)
 Ma Chuo, general and official of Wuyue (or 922)
 Muhammad ibn Jarir al-Tabari, Persian scholar (b. 839)
 Reccared, Galician clergyman (b. 885)
 Ricwin (or Ricuin), Frankish nobleman 
 Walter (or Vaulter), archbishop of Sens
 Wang Yanzhang, general of Later Liang (b. 863)
 Zhao Yan, military prefect and official of Later Liang
 Zhu Youzhen, emperor of Later Liang (b. 888)

References